Tegenaria longimana is a spider species found in Turkey, Georgia and Russia.

See also 
 List of Agelenidae species

References

External links 

longimana
Spiders of Europe
Spiders of Georgia (country)
Spiders of Russia
Arthropods of Turkey
Spiders described in 1898